The 2021 Pittsburgh Panthers men's soccer team represented the University of Pittsburgh during the 2021 NCAA Division I men's soccer season.  The Panthers were led by head coach Jay Vidovich, in his sixth season.  They played home games at Ambrose Urbanic Field.  This was the team's 68th season playing organized men's college soccer and their 9th playing in the Atlantic Coast Conference.

The Panthers finished the season 13–5–2 overall and 5–2–1 in ACC play to finish in a tie for first place in the Coastal Division.  They won a tiebreaker with Duke to be awarded the first overall seed in the ACC Tournament.  They earned a bye into the Quarterfinals where they defeated Virginia Tech before losing to eventual champions Notre Dame in the Semifinals.  They received an at-large bid to the NCAA Tournament and were awarded the fifth overall seed.  After a First Round bye, they defeated Northern Illinois in the Second Round and Hofstra in the Third Round before losing to Notre Dame on penalties to end their season.

Background 

The teams' 2020 season was significantly impacted by the COVID-19 pandemic, which curtailed the fall season and caused the NCAA Tournament to be played in Spring 2021. The ACC was one of the only two conferences in men's soccer to play in the fall of 2020.  The ACC also held a mini-season during the spring of 2021.

The Panthers finished the fall season 7–1–0 and 4–0–0 in ACC play to finish in first place in the North Division.  In the ACC Tournament they defeated Duke in the Quarterfinals and Notre Dame in the Semifinals before losing to Clemson in the Final.  They finished the spring season 6–1–0 and 5–1–0 in ACC play, to finish in first place in the Coastal Division.  They received an at-large bid to the NCAA Tournament because they lost the automatic bid play-in game to Clemson.  As the second seed in the tournament, they defeated Monmouth in the Second Round, UCF in the Third Round, and Washington in the Quarterfinals before losing to Indiana in the Semifinals to end their season.

At the end of the season, one Panthers men's soccer player was selected in the 2021 MLS SuperDraft: Edward Kizza.

Player movement

Players leaving

Players arriving

Squad

Roster

Team management

Source:

Schedule 

Source:

|-
!colspan=6 style=""| Exhibition

|-
!colspan=6 style=""| Regular season
|-

|-
!colspan=6 style=""| ACC Tournament

|-
!colspan=6 style=""| NCAA Tournament

Awards and honors

Rankings

2022 MLS Super Draft

Source:

References 

2021
Pittsburgh Panthers
Pittsburgh Panthers
Pittsburgh Panthers men's soccer
Pittsburgh